Route 195 is an 87 km two-lane north/south highway in Quebec, Canada, which starts in Matane at the junction of Route 132 and ends in Saint-Zénon-du-Lac-Humqui. The highway acts mainly as a shortcut between Matane and the southern section of Route 132 which leads to the Matapédia River Valley and the southern part of the Gaspé Peninsula.

Municipalities along Route 195
 Saint-Zénon-du-Lac-Humqui
 Saint-Léon-le-Grand
 Amqui
 Saint-Tharcisius
 Saint-Vianney
 Saint-René-de-Matane
 Matane

See also
 List of Quebec provincial highways

References

External links 
 Interactive Provincial Route Map (Quebec Ministry of Transportation) 
 Route 195 on Google Maps

195
Roads in Bas-Saint-Laurent
Matane